Matthew Thomas Palmer (born 27 February 1995) is an English professional footballer who plays as a midfielder for National League club Notts County.

Career

Burton Albion
Palmer was born in Derby, Derbyshire. He joined Burton Albion's youth academy after being released by Derby County. He secured the award for most improved young player at the end of his first season as a scholar at the club. He made his debut on 15 November 2012 as an 89th-minute substitute in the FA Cup, in a 2–0 away win over Altrincham. He made his League Two debut on 5 April 2013, coming on 79 minutes into a 7–1 away defeat to Port Vale. Palmer's first goal came on 10 November 2013 in a 2–0 home win over Hereford United in the first round of the FA Cup. He came on as a 78th-minute substitute on 26 May in the 2014 League Two play-off Final, in which Burton were beaten 1–0 by Fleetwood Town at Wembley Stadium.

Palmer joined League One club Oldham Athletic on 22 January 2016 on a one-month loan.

Rotherham United
Palmer signed for League One club Rotherham United on 25 January 2018 on a two-and-a-half-year contract for an undisclosed fee.

He joined newly relegated League Two club Bradford City on 5 July 2019 on a season-long loan.

Swindon Town
Palmer signed for club Swindon Town on 31 January 2020 on an 18-month deal after his contract was terminated at Rotherham United. He scored his first goal for Swindon in an EFL Trophy tie against Exeter City on 6 October 2020.

Palmer signed for Wigan Athletic on loan until 4 January 2021

On 14 May 2021 it was announced that he would leave Swindon at the end of the season, following the expiry of his contract.

Notts County
On 21 July 2021, Palmer signed a two year contract with Notts County F.C.

On 25 December 2022, Palmer extended his contract with Notts County F.C. until the end of the 2024-25 season

Career statistics

Honours
Burton Albion
Football League Two: 2014–15
Football League One runner-up: 2015–16

Rotherham United
EFL League One play-offs: 2018

Swindon Town
EFL League Two: 2019–20

References

External links
Profile at the Rotherham United F.C. website

1995 births
Living people
Footballers from Derby
Footballers from Derbyshire
English footballers
Association football midfielders
Derby County F.C. players
Burton Albion F.C. players
Oldham Athletic A.F.C. players
Rotherham United F.C. players
Bradford City A.F.C. players
Swindon Town F.C. players
Wigan Athletic F.C. players
Notts County F.C. players
English Football League players
National League (English football) players